Naria nebrites, common name the false margined cowry, is a species of sea snail, a cowry, a marine gastropod mollusk in the family Cypraeidae, the cowries.

Subspecies and formae
 Naria nebrites ceylonica (f) Schilder, F.A. & M. Schilder, 1938 
 Naria nebrites oblonga (f) Melvill, J.C., 1888

Description

Distribution
This species is distributed in the Red Sea and in the Indian Ocean along East Africa, Eritrea, Kenya, Somalia, Sri Lanka and Singapore.

References

 Verdcourt, B. (1954). The cowries of the East African Coast (Kenya, Tanganyika, Zanzibar and Pemba). Journal of the East Africa Natural History Society 22(4) 96: 129–144, 17 pls.

Cypraeidae
Gastropods described in 1888